Brigadier-General Arthur Edward Dalzell, 13th Earl of Carnwath, CB (25 December 1851 – 9 March 1941) was a British Army officer and a Representative Peer of Scotland.

Family
Dalzell was born into an old Scottish family. He was the fourth of five children born to Colonel the Honourable Robert Alexander George Dalzell (1816–1878) and Sarah Bushby Harris (1821–1916). His father was the fourth son of Robert Alexander Dalzell, 6th Earl of Carnwath, and his mother the daughter of John and Amelia Harris of Eldon House, London, Ontario, Canada. His elder brother Robert succeeded an uncle as Earl of Carnwath in 1887, when Arthur and his sisters were raised to the rank of children of an Earl by Royal Warrant of Precedence.

Dalzell married at St Peter's Church, Eaton Square, on 4 December 1902 Muriel Wyndham Knatchbull, daughter of Colonel Norton Knatchbull. They had two children:
Muriel Marjorie Dalzell (22 September 1903 – 18 February 1995), married in 1927 Major John Norton Taylor.
Arthur Robert Dalzell (11 March 1907 – 28 February 1909).

Military career
Receiving his education at East Sheen and Cheltenham, he joined the 12th or Suffolk Regiment as an Ensign in 1870. The following year he transferred to the 52nd (Oxfordshire) Regiment of Foot and was commissioned a lieutenant on 1 November 1871. He had become a supernumerary captain by March 1882, and made full captain on 7 October 1885. While he served with his regiment in Malta he first saw active service in Upper Burma between 1891 and 1892. By now a Major, he was appointed as Inspector of Gymnasia in Bengal and Punjab he returned to his regular duties in 1896. Further promotions followed and he served in the Second Boer War, seeing action at Paardeberg and other campaigns during the conflict. He was made a Companion of the Order of the Bath (CB) on 29 November 1900 for his services there.

His sister Lady Maud Rolleston writes about their time in South Africa during the 2nd Boer War in her book "Yeoman service : being the diary of the wife of an imperial yeomanry office during the Boer War".
Amongst various adventures of her own, she set up a convalescent home for soldiers in Kimberley and helped nurse her badly injured husband Col Lancelot Rolleston back to health.

After his return from South Africa, Dalzell became commanding officer of the 1st Battalion, the Oxfordshire Light Infantry.

Ultimately promoted to the position of honorary Brigadier-General, Dalzell served on the Western Front during World War I.

Peer
Upon the death of his nephew, Ronald Arthur Dalzell, 12th Earl of Carnwath, in 1931 he succeeded to the peerage as Earl of Carnwath and was subsequently elected a Scottish Representative Peer in 1935. He died on 9 March 1941 at his country residence, Sand House, Wedmore, Somerset, England. Lady Carnwarth died in 1958.

Sources 

 The Times 30 May 1916
 The Times 12 March 1941

1851 births
1941 deaths
British Army brigadiers
British Army generals of World War I
British Army personnel of the Second Boer War
Scottish generals
Companions of the Order of the Bath
Earls of Carnwath
Oxfordshire and Buckinghamshire Light Infantry officers
Scottish representative peers
Suffolk Regiment officers
52nd Regiment of Foot officers